Sensational Kidnapping (Spanish:Secuestro sensacional) is a 1942 Argentine comedy film directed by Luis Bayón Herrera and starring Luis Sandrini, Elsa O'Connor and Osvaldo Miranda. After somebody runs away from home, it is wrongly believed they have been kidnapped.

The film's sets were designed by the art director Juan Manuel Concado.

Cast
 Luis Sandrini as Juan Martínez
 Nelly Hering as Ana Suárez
 Elsa O'Connor  as Leonor
 Rafael Frontaura as Carlos Suárez
 Osvaldo Miranda as Alberto Torres
 Marcelo Ruggero as Italiano
 Francisco Pablo Donadío as Juez
 Lucía Barause as María
 María Luisa Notar
 Alberto Adhemar as Policía
 Celia Podestá
 Pedro Martínez as Pedrín
 María Goicochea
 Jorge Villoldo as Portero
 Félix Tortorelli as Hombre en comida
 Martha Atoche as Mujer en comida

References

Bibliography 
 Alfred Charles Richard. Censorship and Hollywood's Hispanic image: an interpretive filmography, 1936-1955. Greenwood Press, 1993.

External links 
 

1942 films
1942 comedy films
Argentine comedy films
1940s Spanish-language films
Films directed by Luis Bayón Herrera
Argentine black-and-white films
1940s Argentine films